Scorpaenopsis obtusa, the shortsnout scorpionfish, is a species of venomous marine ray-finned fish belonging to the family Scorpaenidae, the scorpionfishes. This species is found in the Indo-West Pacific all the way from Western Australia to Papua New Guinea and then north to Japan.

Size

References

obtusa
Taxa named by John Ernest Randall
Taxa named by William N. Eschmeyer
Fish described in 2002